Anolis squamulatus, the small-scaled anole, is a species of lizard in the family Dactyloidae. The species is found in Venezuela.

References

Anoles
Reptiles described in 1863
Endemic fauna of Venezuela
Reptiles of Venezuela
Taxa named by Wilhelm Peters